The 1996 Las Vegas 500K was the second round of the 1996-1997 Indy Racing League. The race was held on September 15, 1996, at the  Las Vegas Motor Speedway in Clark County, Nevada. It was the fifth and last race for the IRL in the year 1996, and, thus, the last under the frozen 1995 IndyCar regulations, before the arrival of the new chassis and engine formula for 1997. Richie Hearn was the winner of a race defined by its multiple crashes and high attrition, with nine lengthy cautions, 83 laps under yellow, a red flag and four drivers being extricated from their cars.

At 300 miles in length, it tied the existing record for non-500 mile Indy Car oval races, alongside the Trenton 300 (1969 - 1972) and the 1966 Atlanta 300. The race was completed at an average speed of just 115.171 mph, becoming the slowest Indy car superspeedway race since the 1946 Indianapolis 500, which was completed on an average of 114.820 mph with qualifying speeds that were 100 mph slower. It would also be the slowest race held at the Las Vegas oval by a major racing series until the 2018 edition of the NASCAR Cup Series race.

Report

Pre-Race 
Less than a month after the season opener at New Hampshire, the Indy Racing League would cut the ribbon of the new oval at Las Vegas, even though some amenities and facilities within the track were still under construction. Michel Jourdain Jr. kept himself busy by racing at the last two Indy Car events of the year at Vancouver and Laguna Seca, with Richie Hearn also competing in the latter. Tony Stewart competed in the three NASCAR Busch Series scheduled in between the IRL events, and John Paul Jr. had successful outings in IMSA GT, with a win at Mosport and a third place in a street course at Dallas.

In the meantime, the League secured the addition of another new venue, the Texas Motor Speedway. The 500-kilometre race, to be held on June 7, 1997, was expected to be the first round of the planned 1997–98 season, despite being scheduled just two weeks after the Indianapolis 500. This announcement was preceded by a private test by Team Menard at Atlanta Motor Speedway, another track owned by Bruton Smith's Speedway Motorsports, which fueled speculations about a future IRL round. Tony Stewart's fastest lap was reportedly in the 213 mph range.

The entry list was unveiled on September 4, with 26 drivers listed. Treadway Racing added a two-year-old car for Johnny O'Connell, who had not run at New Hampshire after losing his Cunningham ride. Dave Steele, who failed to pass their rookie test before the New Hampshire round, and Juan Carlos Carbonell, who also failed at New Hampshire but got to pass his test on an August 25 test at Phoenix, were entered again by ABF Motorsports and Tempero–Giuffre Racing, while Johnny Parsons and Michel Jourdain Jr. were back in their regular Team Blueprint Racing and Team Scandia rides after missing the previous round. Walker Racing entered a car without naming a driver, and Lyn St. James also filled an entry, but she lacked a car, and it would not be found in time for the race weekend, forcing her to withdraw. One week before the race, Della Penna Motorsports confirmed it would leave the IRL after the race to complete its expected full-time move to Champ Car with Richie Hearn as a driver.

Practice and qualifying
More entries were filled on race week, adding to a total of 29 entries, a record for a non-Indy 500 IRL race. On September 11, Walker confirmed that Robby Gordon, who had ended a lacklustre IndyCar season the week prior and was bound to NASCAR for 1997, would drive with the team for the last time at Las Vegas, being considered by the media as the marquee name of the event. Scandia also confirmed a new entry, to be run as a second car by the Arizona Motorsports crew, for Brazilian rookie Affonso Giaffone, who had finished third in the 1995 Indy Lights season, and Tyce Carlson and Brad Murphey were confirmed to retain their drives at PDM Racing and Hemelgarn Racing, having been absent from the first entry list. Like Carbonell and Steele, Giaffone would be subject to pass the USAC rookie test, as well as Stan Wattles, who had not run in a +200 mph speedway in a race weekend.

On a track that was deemed to be even dirtier than in June testing, Buddy Lazier led the Friday morning practice with a 221.766 mph lap, followed by Richie Hearn and Eliseo Salazar. In the afternoon practice, Lazier finished third and was the first driver to beat Richie Hearn's unofficial lap record from testing. However, he could not get close to Arie Luyendyk, who led the proceedings with an impressive lap of 229.768 mph, and an almost 5 mph advantage over Mark Dismore. Luyendyk kept setting the pace on Saturday morning practice with a 226.757 mph, leading the field by more than 2 mph. Roberto Guerrero finished second in front of Mike Groff, but he crashed in Turn 2 one hour into the session. He was testing Pagan's backup car, a Reynard 94I that was intended to be qualified before the crash, as it offered less drag. With the session about to end, Dave Steele, who had been allowed to qualify despite topping at 202 mph, also crashed between Turns 1 and 2. His Lola T92 was too damaged to be qualified and, as the team lacked a back-up car, they withdraw from the event.

In qualifying, championship leader Scott Sharp was the first driver to go over 220 mph with a 222.322 mph lap, being edged by Mike Groff soon after. Then, Robby Gordon put himself on the provisional pole with a 223.371 mph lap, until Tony Stewart qualified. The Menard driver, who had mechanical issues on Friday afternoon and had finished 12th in all practice sessions, put a 224.225 mph lap on the board. That was not a match for Arie Luyendyk's performance, as the Dutch was the only driver to lap under 24 seconds with two laps in 226 mph, and got the third pole position of his career with a 226.491 mph best lap. Stewart finished second, with Gordon and Lazier comprising the second row, while Davey Hamilton and Groff qualified in a career-best fifth and sixth place, in front of Sharp.

In their first Indy car qualifying, Affonso Giaffone finished 23rd and Juan Carlos Carbonell, despite topping at 194 mph in practice, finished last with a 181.208 mph, six seconds off Luyendyk's time. Michele Alboreto only managed to qualify in 18th place with pop-off valve issues; Michel Jourdain Jr., who had been 10th fastest in morning practice, waved off his first lap and qualified in 22nd place after losing a cylinder in his car, and Eddie Cheever suffered an engine failure just before taking the green flag, being only able to qualify in 27th place.

That morning, Galles Racing announced that they would field a team in the Indy Racing League in 1997 with Davy Jones, who finished second at the Indy 500 and had taken the place of Eddie Lawson a few months earlier, as their driver. Also, three-times Tour de France winner Greg LeMond announced he would start a career in open-wheel racing in Indy Lights, although he ended up competing in U.S. F2000. At 3:20 p.m., R.C. "Rod" Mathis, a 49-year-old retired Las Vegas police officer, suffered multiple injuries in a crash at Turn 4 during a Shelby Pro Series support race, held before the last IRL practice session. He was airlifted to University Medical Center of Southern Nevada, where he was pronounced dead at 10:49 p.m., becoming the track's first fatality.

Failed to qualify or withdrew
 Dave Steele R for ABF Motorsports

Race
Despite long traffic jams that continued throughout the race, an estimated crowd of 67.132 spectators made it to the yet unfinished Las Vegas Motor Speedway for its first big race on a windy afternoon that played havoc with the outside line, blowing sand onto the track. Arie Luyendyk kept the lead at the start, but Tony Stewart conceded second place with Robby Gordon in Turn 3. Further back, electrical issues left Davey Hamilton immediately out of contention, and John Paul Jr. took advantage of a slight slow down by some of the drivers in front of him to gain six places, jumping from 12th to 6th. He would later pass Mike Groff for fifth. Gordon started to reel on Luyendyk, but the lapped cars of Juan Carlos Carbonell and Brad Murphey made him lose the position again to Stewart on Lap 8. In the next lap, Johnny Parsons suffered an engine failure while running 19th. He failed to keep the control of the car and spun on his own oil, crashing in Turn 4. This was the last start of his Indy car career, which harkened all the way back to 1969.

After a long cleanup, the green flag flew on Lap 19. Stewart's crew were not aware the race was going to be restarted, prompting Stewart to lose three spots with Gordon, Buddy Lazier and Paul Jr. Soon after, Lazier lost pace and started to drop places with an unspecified issue that led to an eventual retirement. This allowed Michel Jourdain Jr., who had climbed to 14th at the end of Lap 2, into the Top 10, with the Mexican being eighth by Lap 28. With traffic as a factor, Gordon caught Luyendyk and both drivers overtook one another from Lap 26 to 28. After Gordon took the lead for the second time, Eddie Cheever, running in 18th place, was rammed from behind by Brad Murphey, who was a lap down in 26th place, both making hard contact with the wall. Stéphan Grégoire, running 21st at the time, was also involved, as he hit a loose tire and crashed with back end of Cheever's car while trying to get past between the two destroyed cars, which were still moving. Murphey had to be extricated from his car and airlifted to University Medical Center with a broken right thighbone, pelvis and hip. He underwent various surgeries and, although he recovered successfully, he would never race again in the IRL.

During the caution, John Paul Jr. pitted from third, and Tony Stewart did so a few laps later as a precautionary measure, removing a punctured tire in the process. At the restart, Gordon and Luyendyk pulled away from Mike Groff, while Roberto Guerrero, who restarted fourth, began suffering handling issues that dropped him down the order. On Lap 55, while running in 16th place, Tyce Carlson collided with the lapped car of Carbonell, in 22nd place at the time, and crashed in Turn 2, coming to rest on the sandy surface alongside the backstraight. All of the front runners who had not pitted yet made their first pit stop on the ensuing caution, conceding the lead to John Paul Jr. over Tony Stewart, while Mark Dismore, who had also stopped in the previous caution, split Gordon and Luyendyk in fourth place. Richie Hearn gained two positions over Groff and Scott Sharp and, after the race went back to green, battled with Luyendyk for fifth place, both closing on Gordon and Dismore afterwards. Michel Jourdain Jr. followed suit, passing Groff and Sharp on track.

Stewart followed Paul Jr. closely in the following laps, but he was unable to make a pass. On Lap 78, just as Luyendyk was passing Dismore for fourth, Stewart's car snapped suddenly on Turn 2, crashing sideways. He suffered a broken left collarbone and neck ligament damage, being transported to University Medical Center by ambulance. With Paul and Dismore pitting during the caution, Gordon regained the lead, but Richie Hearn took the spotlight. Now in third place, and after repelling a pass by Jourdain, he overtook Luyendyk on Lap 93 and Gordon on Lap 100, with identical moves exiting Turn 4. Gordon was saving fuel, and Luyendyk took advantage two laps later. During these laps, John Paul Jr. suffered a wheel bearing failure and retired while running in seventh place, and Mike Groff had to do a green flag pit stop on Lap 104.

On Lap 107, Luyendyk caused the fifth caution of the day after crashing in Turn 1 due to another wheel bearing failure, bringing the number of cars in the lead lap down to six, among them Michele Alboreto, up to third after passing Jourdain and Sharp in the pit stops, and Johnny O'Connell, in sixth place. Jourdain and Sharp would engage in a battle when the race resumed, with Sharp being an early victor. On Lap 125, Stan Wattles suffered a left-rear puncture and crashed in Turn 4. He had not suffered any injury, but lost consciousness and had to be slowly extricated from his car. It was on this caution period that ABC had to cut off the broadcast of the race, as the slow, caution-filled pace had consumed the allotted TV window with more than 60 laps to go. Due to scheduling conflicts, the race was not moved to ESPN, and only a few selected moments of the remaining laps were aired on late-night news.

During this caution, Alboreto encountered a problem in his car on Lap 138 and had to pit, losing three laps as the race went back to green a lap later. Mark Dismore was the best driver not on the lead lap in sixth place when he had the seventh crash of the day on Lap 151, being removed in a stretcher with pelvis and left hip socket fractures. The order at the top remained unchanged in the subsequent pit stops, but Gordon regained the lead over Hearn at the restart on Lap 161, just before a brief caution period for debris. Hearn answered back on Lap 169, and Sharp could not join the fight as he had a wheel bearing failure on that same lap. Ten laps later, Gordon had the same failure, the fourth of the day related to wheel bearings, being 1.5 seconds behind Hearn.

The high attrition had promoted Johnny O'Connell to third, but he had a mechanical failure 15 laps from the end and crashed in Turn 4. His car went upside down on the right side, and the race was red-flagged, only for O'Connell to climb out of the car before the medical car arrived. After a 20-minute stoppage, the race was restarted to complete its final 15 laps. With just two cars on the lead lap, only Michel Jourdain Jr. was in position to fight Richie Hearn, but the Della Penna driver had a great restart and kept a small gap until the end, bidding farewell to the IRL with the only win of his career in an Indy car event, as well as his last podium. For Jourdain Jr., it would be its only Indy car podium until the 2001 Michigan 500, and his best result until the 2003 Grand Prix of St. Petersburg, as well as his last IRL race during the Split. Coincidentally, both drivers had competed in selected CART races that season, having taken part in the IRL as a stepping stone for a full-time switch in 1997.

Mike Groff took the lead of the championship with his podium finish, and Roberto Guerrero overcame his handling issues to finish fourth in front of Michele Alboreto and Buzz Calkins, who, like Groff, had finished all IRL races outside the Indy 500 in the top 6. Both Alboreto and Calkins were tied for second in the standings, but the Italian would also leave the League for 1997. Affonso Giaffone got to finish his first IRL race in the Top 10, and Juan Carlos Carbonell was black-flagged on Lap 147 for spraying oil on the track, the Chilean already being 30 laps down for his early contact with Tyce Carlson. It would be his only IRL race.

Race Statistics
Lead changes: 10 among 5 drivers

Standings after the race

Drivers' Championship standings

 Note: Only the top five positions are included for the standings.

References

External links
IndyCar official website

1996–97 in IndyCar
Las Vegas 500K
Motorsport in Las Vegas
Las Vegas 500K 1996